The viola caipira, often simply viola, (Portuguese for country guitar) is a Brazilian ten-string guitar with five courses of strings arranged in pairs. It was introduced in the state of São Paulo, where it is widely played as the basis for the música caipira, a type of folk-country music originating in the caipira country of south-central Brazil.

Origins
It has its origins in Portuguese violas. Violas are direct descendants of the Latin guitar, which, in turn, has an Arabic-Persian origin derived from instruments such as the lute. The Portuguese violas arrived in Brazil and along with other instruments began to be used by the Jesuits in the catechism of the indigenous people, and naturally, for Portuguese-Brazilian settlers and ranchers entertainment and company. Later, guitars began to be built with noble wood from the land, which has always been available in large quantities in Brazil. It is likely a descendant of one of the many folk guitars that have traditionally been
played in Portugal. The viola braguesa and viola amarantina, for instance, are two types of ten-string guitars from the north of Portugal, which are closely related to the viola caipira.

Some have described the viola caipira as Brazil's national instrument, but others argue that the tambourine-like pandeiro has a stronger claim. The Brazilian Embassy in Washington lists a national flower among the official symbols of Brazil, but no national musical instrument. What is undisputed is that the viola caipira was introduced in São Paulo before the violão, and is the basis for the música caipira, or São Paulo's folk music, as Inezita Barroso states.

Tuning and playing technique
A large number of tunings are used; open tunings are common. Unlike most steel-string guitars, its strings are plucked with the fingers of the right hand similarly to the technique used for classical and flamenco guitars, rather than by the use of a plectrum.

Popularity
Violas are present in nearly all Brazilian music forms, anywhere in the country (although it is declining in some places). It most often associated with Caipira Music (Brazilian country music), with some forms of North-Eastern music and with folkloric music. It was once used to play urban music, like choro, samba and Maxixe, but has been replaced by the acoustic guitar.

Well-known players of Brazilian viola include Zé Côco do Riachão (composer from Minas Gerais), Toninho Ramos (composer from Minas Gerais live in France) and Almir Sater (successful singer-songwriter from Mato Grosso do Sul).

A National Association of Viola Players (Associação Nacional dos Violeiros) has been founded in 2004 and the Ministry of Culture has declared the preservation of the Viola tradition as of national interest.

Notable performers

 Almir Sater
 Andréa Carneiro
 Bambico (artistic name of Domingos Miguel dos Santos)
 Bemti
 Braz da Viola
 Bruna Viola
 Chico Lobo
 Helena Meireles
 Fernando Sodre
 Heraldo do Monte
 Inezita Barroso
 Ivan Vilela
 Fabienne Magnant (France)
 Mazinho Quevedo
 Nestor da Viola
 Ramon Thiesen
 Renato Andrade
 Renato Teixeira
 Roberto Corrêa
 Teddy Vieira
 Tião Carreiro (artistic name of José Dias Nunes)
 Toninho Ramos
 Zé Mulato

See also
Brazilian seven-string guitar
Viola braguesa
Viola sertaneja
Viola toeira
Viola de cocho
Rabeca

References

External links 
Boa Música Brasileira in Portuguese
Brazilian Musician Viola Player in Portuguese
Junior da Violla Playing Song "Luzeiro" From Almir Sater (YouTube Video)
Brazilian Rock Band Charme Chulo Playing "Polaca Azeda" Using Brazilian Viola (YouTube Music Video)

Acoustic guitars
Guitar family instruments
Brazilian musical instruments